George Wetmore may refer to:
 George P. Wetmore, governor of, and senator from, Rhode Island
 George Walter Wetmore, member of the Florida House of Representatives